Anantapur is a census town and a gram panchayat, in Tamluk CD block in Tamluk subdivision of Purba Medinipur district in the state of West Bengal, India.

Geography

Location

Urbanisation
94.08% of the population of Tamluk subdivision live in the rural areas. Only 5.92% of the population live in the urban areas, and that is the second lowest proportion of urban population amongst the four subdivisions in Purba Medinipur district, just above Egra subdivision.

Note: The map alongside presents some of the notable locations in the subdivision. All places marked in the map are linked in the larger full screen map.

Demographics
As per 2011 Census of India Anantapur had a total population of 5,532 of which 2,849 (52%) were males and 2,683 (48%) were females. Population below 6 years was 701. The total number of literates in Anantapur was 4,328 (89.59% of the population over 6 years).

Infrastructure
As per the District Census Handbook 2011, Anantapur covered an area of 1.3557 km2. It had the facility of a railway station at Raghunathbari 4 km away and bus route in the town. Amongst the civic amenities it had 613 domestic electric connections. Amongst the medical facilities it had 3 medicine shops in the town. Amongst the educational facilities it had were 5 primary schools, 3 middle schools, 1 secondary school and 1 senior secondary school in the town. The nearest degree college was at Tamluk 10 km away. Amongst the recreational and cultural facilities a cinema theatre was there at Radhamani 4 km away.

Transport
Anantapur is on State Highway 4.

Education
Ananatapur Bani Niketan Girls High School is a girls only higher secondary school affiliated to the West Bengal Council of Higher Secondary Education.

Chanserpur High School, PO Chanserpur, is a Bengali-medium boys only higher secondary school, established in 1914. It has arrangements for teaching from class VI to XII. It has a library and a play ground.

Healthcare
Anantapur Rural Hospital at Anantapur, PO Chanserpur (with 30 beds) is the main medical facility in Tamluk CD block. There is a primary health centre at Kelomal Purbanakha, PO Putputia (with 10 beds).

References

Cities and towns in Purba Medinipur district